The women's 100 metres at the 2002 European Athletics Championships were held at the Olympic Stadium on August 6 and August 7.

Medalists

Results

Heats
Qualification: First 3 of each heat (Q) and the next 4 fastest (q) qualified for the semifinals.

Semifinals
Qualification: First 4 of each semifinal (Q) qualified directly for the final.

Final
Wind: -0.7 m/s

External links

100
100 metres at the European Athletics Championships
2002 in women's athletics